Tadahal is a village in Dharwad district of Karnataka, India.

Demographics 
As of the 2011 Census of India there were 498 households in Tadahal and a total population of 2,481 consisting of 1,283 males and 1,198 females. There were 311 children ages 0-6.

References

Villages in Dharwad district